Mikkel Rask (born 22 June 1983) is a Danish former professional footballer who played as a defender.

Club career
Mikkel Rask got his breakthrough in the Danish 1st Division in 2001 playing for Randers FC, but when the club later earned promotion to the Danish Danish Superliga in 2004 and suffered relegation that very same season, Rask moved to Viborg FF to stay in the Superliga. In-all Rask got to play 91 games and score 10 goals at top-flight level for Randers FC and Viborg FF, before Viborg FF suffered relegation in 2008. Rask then signed with Turkish Süper Lig side Diyarbakırspor in 2009, which at first seemed like a good move. However, the Turkish club was in financial trouble, so Mikkel Rask soon left the club in January 2010 and returned to Denmark.

On 1 January 2017 he moved to AGF. The contract ran until the summer of 2018.

Honours
Viborg
Danish 1st Division: 2012–13, 2014–15

References

External links

Danish national team profile
Official Danish Superliga stats
Official Turkisk Football Federation stats

1983 births
Living people
Danish men's footballers
Danish expatriate men's footballers
Randers FC players
Viborg FF players
Diyarbakırspor footballers
FC Fredericia players
Vendsyssel FF players
Süper Lig players
Expatriate footballers in Turkey
People from Randers
Association football defenders
Danish expatriate sportspeople in Turkey
Danish Superliga players
Danish 1st Division players
Denmark youth international footballers
Sportspeople from the Central Denmark Region